The Grand Slam in the Philippine movie industry refers to people who have won all four major film awards in the same category in the same year. The four major organizations that evaluate all Filipino films released in the country and hand out awards for best cinematic output in various categories in a calendar year are the:
 Filipino Academy of Movie Arts and Sciences (FAMAS) – It is the country's oldest movie award-giving body and was established in 1953. It is the successor of the Maria Clara Awards.
 Manunuri ng Pelikulang Pilipino (MPP) – It is the country's premier film critics group composed of 10 esteemed film scholars and National Artists as members and was established in 1976. It is the country's counterpart of the New York Film Critics Circle (NYFCC). It hands out the annual Gawad Urian Awards, the only awards that uses Filipino language. Its first awards were given in 1977.
 Film Academy of the Philippines (FAP) – It is the country's counterpart of the Academy of Motion Picture Arts and Sciences (AMPAS). It was established in 1981 as the official film industry organization. It hands out the Luna Awards (formerly known as FAP Awards), equivalent of the Oscars. Its first awards were given in 1983.
 Philippine Movie Press Club (PMPC) – It was established in 1985 and hands out the Star Awards for Movies. It also hands out television awards, starting in 1987. This made the PMPC as the country's counterpart of the Hollywood Foreign Press Association (HFPA) and made Star Awards the equivalent of the Golden Globe Awards but it holds the movie and television awarding ceremonies separately rather than as a whole.

The term "grand slam" was coined in 1983, when Vilma Santos won the Best Actress award from FAMAS, Urian, FAP and the Catholic Mass Media Awards (CMMA) for her performance in Relasyon. The Catholic Mass Media Awards were created in 1978 and beside movies, they also honor television, radio, print, advertising and music. This awards were part of the original four major awards. When Star Awards were created in 1985, there were five major awards. Ever since the CMMA ceased giving out acting awards sometime in the 1990s, this awards had been relegated as a minor award. Today, "grand slam" has been generally used to refer to winning awards in FAMAS, Urian, Luna and Star in the same year for the same category. In FAMAS Awards, people who had won five awards in a certain competitive category are given Hall of Fame awards and cannot be nominated anymore in any subsequent ceremony. These people can still get a "grand slam" if they win in the other three major awards.

There are rare instances in which an actor/actress won awards for the same role but was placed in different categories because the four organizations mixed up whether a role should be a lead or a supporting. Nevertheless, they still win a "grand slam". For example, Dennis Trillo almost won a "grand slam" for his role in Aishite Imasu 1941: Mahal Kita. He was placed in Best Supporting Actor at the FAMAS and Urian while being placed in Best Actor at the Luna (FAP) and Star. This also can occur when an actor/actress is placed in child categories while being placed in lead or supporting categories in other awards. Only FAMAS and Star give out the child categories. For example, Jiro Manio won Best Child Actor at the FAMAS for his role in Magnifico but won Best Actor at the other three awards.

Nevertheless, it still very rare that a "grand slam" happens, especially now with the boom of independent films in the country. Since 1983, there have been only 19 instances when a "grand slam" occurred.

A further achievement is winning awards given by other award-giving bodies such as the Young Critics Circle, Golden Screen, Gawad TANGLAW, Gawad PASADO and others.

Winners

 Year is based on when the Grand Slam was received, not the year when the film was released.
 Won the Grand Slam, including the CMMA. 
 Was placed in Best Child Actor at the FAMAS while being placed in Best Actor at the other three majors.

Failed bids

 Lost in this award.

 Year is based on when the Grand Slam might be received, not the year when the film was released.
 Was placed in Best Supporting Actor at the FAMAS and Urian while being placed in Best Actor at the Luna (FAP) and Star. He was originally placed in supporting role at the 2004 Metro Manila Film Festival.

References

External links
 Official Website of the Filipino Academy of Movie Arts and Sciences
 Official Website of the Manunuri ng Pelikulang Pilipino
 Official Website of the Film Academy of the Philippines
 Official Facebook of the Philippine Movie Press Club

Cinema of the Philippines
Philippine film awards
Philippine movie grand slam
Philippine film-related lists